Malik Ahmad Monk (born February 4, 1998) is an American professional basketball player for the Sacramento Kings of the National Basketball Association (NBA). He played one season of college basketball for the Kentucky Wildcats, earning consensus second-team All-American honors in 2017. Monk was selected in the first round of the 2017 NBA draft by the Charlotte Hornets with the 11th overall pick. He has also played for the Los Angeles Lakers.

High school career

 
Monk attended East Poinsett County High School in Lepanto, Arkansas for his freshman year. As a freshman, he averaged 22.8 points, 4.6 rebounds, and 2.7 assist per game while leading them to a (25-8) overall record and an appearance in the Class 2A state championship game. After his freshman season, Monk transferred to Bentonville High School in Bentonville, Arkansas. In his junior year, he averaged 26.6 points per game. In the spring and summer of 2015, Monk competed for the Amateur Athletic Union (AAU) team, Arkansas Wings Elite, on the Nike Elite Youth Basketball Circuit (EYBL) where he averaged 19.7 points per game. He then competed on the 2015 Nike Global Challenge for the East team, where he averaged 22 points, 12 rebounds, and four assist in addition to earning Tournament MVP honors. On November 18, 2015 Monk committed to Kentucky, choosing UK over Arkansas. As a senior, he averaged 28.6 points per game, 4.4 assist per game and 7.6 rebounds per game. In 2016, Monk played in the 2016 McDonald's All-American Game and Jordan Brand Classic where he earned Co-MVP honors alongside Kentucky teammate De'Aaron Fox.

On March 11, 2016, Monk played his final high school game, scoring 19 points in a 59–49 loss in the 7A state championship to Cabot High School.

Monk was a consensus five-star prospect and ranked as one of the best players in the 2016 class by the four main recruiting services: Rivals, ESPN, Scout, and 247 Sports. Monk was ranked as the No.9 overall player and No.1 shooting guard in the 2016 high school class.

Recruiting

College career

On November 18, 2015, Monk tweeted that he would be attending the University of Kentucky.

On December 17, 2016, Monk set a University of Kentucky freshman scoring record with 47 points in a win over the University of North Carolina. Twelve days later, he scored 34 points on five-for-seven three point shooting in a 99–76 win over Ole Miss. On January 21, 2017, Monk scored 27 points in a 85–69 win over South Carolina. On January 31, 2017, he scored 37 points against Georgia Bulldogs. On February 25, 2017, Monk tallied 33 points in a 76–66 victory over Florida. On February 28, 2017, Monk scored 27 points in a 73–67 win over Vanderbilt. At the end of his freshman season, Monk was named SEC Player and Freshman of the Year, while also being named to both First-team All-SEC and the SEC All-Freshman team.

At the conclusion of his freshman season, Monk announced that he would forgo his final three years of collegiate eligibility and enter the 2017 NBA draft where he was projected as a first round selection.

Professional career

Charlotte Hornets (2017–2021)

On June 22, 2017, Monk was selected with the eleventh overall pick in the 2017 NBA draft by the Charlotte Hornets. On July 2, 2017, Monk signed his rookie scale contract with the Hornets worth $15,726,047. Monk would miss the entire 2017 NBA Summer League due to an ankle injury. In his fourth game on October 25, 2017, Monk recorded 17 points, two steals, and two assists in a 110–93 victory against the Denver Nuggets. On November 1, 2017, with Kentucky coach John Calipari on hand, Monk scored 25 points in a 126–121 victory against the Milwaukee Bucks.

During his rookie season, Monk was assigned to the Hornets’ NBA G League affiliate, the Greensboro Swarm, for one game. He scored 25 points, collected eight rebounds and recorded four assists in a December 26, 2017 game. On February 26, 2020, Monk was suspended indefinitely for violating the NBA's substance use policy. Before the suspension, Monk was averaging 10.3 points and 2.9 rebounds per game. He was reinstated on June 8, after it was determined he was in compliance with the anti-drug program. On February 1, 2021, Monk scored a then career-high 36 points in a 129–121 overtime win over the Heat.

Los Angeles Lakers (2021–2022)
On August 6, 2021, Monk signed with the Los Angeles Lakers on a trade exception salary deal. On April 10, 2022, Monk put up a then career-high 41 points in a 146–141 win over the Denver Nuggets.

Sacramento Kings (2022–present)
On July 6, 2022, Monk signed a two-year, $19 million contract with the Sacramento Kings reuniting with his former college teammate De'Aaron Fox. On February 24, 2023, Monk put up a career-high 45 points in a 176–175 double-overtime win over the Los Angeles Clippers, the second-highest scoring game in NBA history.

Career statistics

NBA

Regular season

|-
| style="text-align:left;"| 
| style="text-align:left;"| Charlotte
| 63 || 0 || 13.6 || .360 || .342 || .842 || 1.0 || 1.4 || .3 || .1 || 6.7
|-
| style="text-align:left;"| 
| style="text-align:left;"| Charlotte
| 73 || 0 || 17.2 || .387 || .330 || .882 || 1.9 || 1.6 || .5 || .3 || 8.9
|-
| style="text-align:left;"| 
| style="text-align:left;"| Charlotte
| 55 || 1 || 21.3 || .434 || .284 || .820 || 2.9 || 2.1 || .5 || .3 || 10.3
|-
| style="text-align:left;"| 
| style="text-align:left;"| Charlotte
| 42 || 0 || 20.9 || .434 || .401 || .819 || 2.4 || 2.1 || .5 || .1 || 11.7
|-
| style="text-align:left;"| 
| style="text-align:left;"| L.A. Lakers
| 76|| 37 || 28.1|| .473	 || .391 || .795 || 3.4 || 2.9 || .8 || .4 || 13.8
|- class="sortbottom"
| style="text-align:center;" colspan="2"| Career
| 309|| 38 || 20.4 || .424|| .355|| .827 || 2.3|| 2.0|| .5|| .2 || 10.3

College

|-
| style="text-align:left;"| 2016–17
| style="text-align:left;"| Kentucky
| 38 || 37 || 32.1 || .450 || .397 || .822 || 2.5 || 2.3 || .9 || .5 || 19.8

Personal life
Monk was born to Jackie Monk and Michael Scales and is the younger brother of former Arkansas All-SEC wide receiver Marcus Monk.

References

External links

Kentucky Wildcats bio

1998 births
Living people
21st-century African-American sportspeople
African-American basketball players
All-American college men's basketball players
American men's basketball players
Basketball players from Arkansas
Bentonville High School alumni
Charlotte Hornets draft picks
Charlotte Hornets players
Kentucky Wildcats men's basketball players
Los Angeles Lakers players
McDonald's High School All-Americans
People from Bentonville, Arkansas
People from Lepanto, Arkansas
Sacramento Kings players
Shooting guards